A voting age is a minimum age established by law that a person must attain before they become eligible to vote in a public election.

History
In 1890, the South African Republic, commonly known as the Transvaal Republic, set a voting age of 18 years. The effort was, like later legislation expanding voting rights for women and impoverished whites, in part an attempt to skew the electorate further in favour of Afrikaner interests against uitlanders.

Prior to the Second World War of 1939–1945, the voting age in almost all countries was 21 years or higher. In 1946 Czechoslovakia became the first state to reduce the voting age to 18 years, and by 1968 a total of 17 countries had lowered their voting age, of which 8 were in Latin America, and 8 were communist countries. 

Many countries, particularly in Western Europe and North America, reduced their voting ages to 18 years during the 1970s, starting with the United Kingdom (Representation of the People Act 1969), Canada, West Germany (1970), the United States (26th Amendment, 1971), Australia (1974), France (1974), Sweden (1975) and others. It was argued that if young men could be drafted to go to war at 18, they should be able to vote at the age of 18. By the end of the 20th century, 18 had become by far the most common voting age. However, a few countries maintain a voting age of 20 years or higher, and a few countries have a lower voting age of 16 or 17.

In the late 20th and early 21st centuries voting ages were lowered to 18 in Japan, India, Switzerland, Austria, the Maldives, and Morocco.

The vast majority of countries and territories have a minimum voting age of 18-years-old as of October 2020. According to data from the ACE Electoral Knowledge Network, 205 countries and territories have a minimum voting age of 18 for national elections out of 237 countries and territories the organisation has data on as of October 2020. As of the aforementioned date, 12 countries or territories have a minimum voting age of less than 18, with 3 countries or territories at 17-years-old, and 9 countries or territories at 16-years-old. 16-years-old is the lowest minimum age globally for national elections, while the highest is 25-years-old which is only the case in the United Arab Emirates (UAE). This age of 25 was also the case in Italy for Senate (upper house) elections until it was lowered to 18 in 2021. Italy's lower house of Parliament, the Chamber of Deputies, has had a minimum voting age of 18 since 1975, when it was lowered from 21.

Debate on lowering the voting age to 16

By country 

Around 2000, a number of countries began to consider whether the voting age ought to be reduced further, with arguments most often being made in favour of a reduction to 16. In Brazil, the age was lowered to 16 in the 1988 Constitution, while the lower voting age took effect for the first time in the 1989 Presidential Election. The earliest moves in Europe came during the 1990s, when the voting age for municipal elections in some States of Germany was lowered to 16. Lower Saxony was the first state to make such a reduction, in 1995, and four other states did likewise.

In 2007, Austria became the first country to allow 16- and 17-year-olds to vote in national elections, with the expanded franchise first being consummated in the 2009 European Parliament election. A study of young voters' behaviour on that occasion showed them to be as capable as older voters to articulate their beliefs and to make voting decisions appropriate for their preferences. Their knowledge of the political process was only insignificantly lower than in older cohorts, while trust in democracy and willingness to participate in the process were markedly higher. Additionally, there was evidence found for the first time of a voting boost among young people age 16–25 in Austria.

During the 2000s several proposals for a reduced voting age were put forward in U.S. states, including California, Florida and Alaska, but none were successful. In Oregon, Senate Joint Resolution 22 has been introduced to reduce the voting age from 18 to 16. A national reduction was proposed in 2005 in Canada and in the Australian state of New South Wales, but these proposals were not adopted. In May 2009, Danish Member of Parliament Mogens Jensen presented an initiative to the Parliamentary Assembly of the Council of Europe in Strasbourg to lower the voting age in Europe to 16.

Demands to reduce the voting age to 16 years were again brought forward by activists of the school strike for climate movement in several countries (including Germany and the UK).

Australia 
After Premier Don Dunstan introduced the Age of Majority (Reduction) Bill in October 1970, the voting age in South Australia was lowered to 18 years old in 1973.

On 21 October 2019, Greens MP Bandt introduced a bill in the House of Representatives to lower the voting age to 16.

A report suggesting that consideration be given to reducing the voting age to 16 in the Australian Capital Territory in Canberra, Australia was tabled in the territorial legislature on 26 September 2007 and defeated.

In 2015, federal Opposition Leader Bill Shorten said that the voting age should be lowered to 16.

Austria 
In 2007, Austria became the first member of the European Union to adopt a voting age of 16 for most purposes. The voting age had been reduced in Austria from 19 to 18 at all levels in 1992. At that time a voting age of 16 was proposed by the Green Party, but was not adopted.

The voting age for municipal elections in some states was lowered to 16 shortly after 2000. Three states had made the reduction by 2003 (Burgenland, Carinthia and Styria), and in May 2003 Vienna became the fourth. Salzburg followed suit, and so by the start of 2005 the total had reached at least five states out of nine. As a consequence of state law, reduction of the municipal voting age in the states of Burgenland, Salzburg and Vienna resulted in the reduction of the regional voting age in those states as well.

After the 2006 election, the winning SPÖ-ÖVP coalition announced on 12 January 2007 that one of its policies would be the reduction of the voting age to 16 for elections in all states and at all levels in Austria. The policy was set in motion by a Government announcement on 14 March, and a bill proposing an amendment to the Constitution was presented to the legislature on 2 May. On 5 June the National Council approved the proposal following a recommendation from its Constitution Committee. During the passage of the bill through the chamber relatively little opposition was raised to the reduction, with four out of five parties explicitly supporting it; indeed, there was some dispute over which party had been the first to suggest the idea. Greater controversy surrounded the other provisions of the bill concerning the Briefwahl, or postal vote, and the extension of the legislative period for the National Council from four to five years. A further uncontroversial inclusion was a reduction in the candidacy age from 19 to 18. The Federal Council approved the Bill on 21 June, with no party voting against it. The voting age was reduced when the Bill's provisions came into force on 1 July 2007. Austria thus became the first member of the European Union, and the first of the developed world democracies, to adopt a voting age of 16 for all purposes. Lowering the voting age encouraged political interest in young people in Austria.  More sixteen- and seventeen-year-olds voted than eighteen-to-twenty-one-year-olds in Austria.

Brazil 
Brazil lowered the voting age from 18 to 16 in the 1988 constitution. The presidential election of 1989 was the first with the lower voting age. People between the ages 18 and 70 are required to vote. The person must be 16 full years old on the eve of the election (In years without election, the person must be 16 full years old on or before 31 December). If they turn 18 years old after the election, the vote is not compulsory. When they turn 18 years old before the election, the vote is compulsory.

Canada 
Canada lowered its federal voting age from 21 to 18 in 1970. A further reduction to 16 was proposed in 2005, but was not adopted. It was proposed again in 2011, but was not adopted.

In August 2018, in British Columbia, a group of 20 youth partnered with Dogwood BC to launch a Vote16 campaign. Currently, they have unanimous support from the Union of BC Municipalities, as well as endorsements from the province's Green Party and New Democratic Party representatives. The campaign is now waiting for it to be brought up in the legislative assembly by the NDP and for it to pass there.

In 2020, Canadian Senator Marilou McPhedran introduced a bill to lower the federal voting age from 18 to 16. In 2021, a group of young people filed a court challenge to lower the federal voting age from 18. Several weeks later, Taylor Bachrach introduced a private member's bill to lower the voting age to 16. The bill will be debated in May 2022.

Cuba 
As stated in the Constitution of the Republic of Cuba, the voting age is 16 for men and women.

Germany 
As part of their 2021 coalition deal, the SPD, Greens and FDP agreed to lower the voting age to 16 within the course of the 20th Bundestag.

Iceland 
The first proposal to lower the voting age to 16 years was submitted in parliament in 2007. A bill to lower the voting age for municipal elections reached the final reading in 2018, but was filibustered by opponents until the close of the parliamentary session.

Iran 
Iran had been unique in awarding suffrage at 15, but raised the age to 18 in January 2007 despite the opposition of the Government. In May 2007 the Iranian Cabinet proposed a bill to reverse the increase.

Luxembourg 
Luxembourg has compulsory voting from the age of 18. A proposal by the government to introduce optional voting for those aged 16 and 17 was rejected by 81% of voters in a June 2015 referendum.

Malta 
On 20 November 2013, Malta lowered the voting age from 18 to 16 for local elections starting from 2015. The proposal had wide support from both the government and opposition, social scientists and youth organizations.

On Monday, 5 March 2018, the Maltese Parliament unanimously voted in favour of amending the constitution, lowering the official voting age from 18 to 16 for general elections, European Parliament Elections and referendums, making Malta the second state in the EU to lower its voting age to 16.

New Zealand 
The New Zealand Green Party MP Sue Bradford announced on 21 June 2007 that she intended to introduce her Civics Education and Voting Age Bill on the next occasion upon which a place became available for the consideration of Members' Bills. When this happened on 25 July Bradford abandoned the idea, citing an adverse public reaction. The Bill would have sought to reduce the voting age to 16 in New Zealand and make civics education part of the compulsory curriculum in schools.

On 21 November 2022, the Supreme Court of New Zealand ruled in Make It 16 Incorporated v Attorney-General that the voting age of 18 was "inconsistent with the bill of rights to be free from discrimination on the basis of age". Prime Minister Jacinda Ardern subsequently announced that a bill to lower the voting age to 16 would be debated in parliament, requiring a supermajority to pass.

United Kingdom 
The Representation of the People Act 1969 lowered the voting age from 21 to 18 for elections to the House of Commons of the Parliament of the United Kingdom, the first major democratic nation to do so. The 1970 United Kingdom general election is the first in which this Act had effect.

Men in military service who turned 19 during the first world war were entitled to vote in 1918 irrespective of their age as part of the Representation of the People Act 1918 which also allowed some women over the age of 30 to vote.  The Representation of the People (Equal Franchise) Act 1928 brought the voting age for women down to 21.

The reduction of the voting age to 16 in the United Kingdom was first given serious consideration in 1999, when the House of Commons considered in Committee an amendment proposed by Simon Hughes to the Representation of the People Bill. This was the first time the reduction of a voting age below 18 had ever been put to a vote in the Commons. The Government opposed the amendment, and it was defeated by 434 votes to 36.

The Votes at 16 coalition, a group of political and charitable organisations supporting a reduction of the voting age to 16, was launched on in 2003. At that time a Private Member's Bill was also proposed in the House of Lords by Lord Lucas.

In 2004, the UK Electoral Commission conducted a major consultation on the subject of the voting age and age of candidacy, and received a significant response. In its conclusions, it recommended that the voting age remain at 18. In 2005, the House of Commons voted 136-128 (on a free vote) against a Private Member's Bill for a reduction in the voting age to 16 proposed by Liberal Democrat MP Stephen Williams. Parliament chose not to include a provision reducing the voting age in the Electoral Administration Act during its passage in 2006.

The report of the Power Inquiry in 2006 called for a reduction of the voting age, and of the candidacy age for the House of Commons, to 16. On the same day the Chancellor of the Exchequer, Gordon Brown, indicated in an article in The Guardian that he favoured a reduction provided it was made concurrently with effective citizenship education.

The Ministry of Justice published in 2007 a Green Paper entitled The Governance of Britain, in which it proposed the establishment of a "Youth Citizenship Commission". The Commission would examine the case for lowering the voting age. On launching the paper in the House of Commons, Prime Minister Gordon Brown said: "Although the voting age has been 18 since 1969, it is right, as part of that debate, to examine, and hear from young people themselves, whether lowering that age would increase participation."

During the Youth Parliament debates of in 2009 in the House of Commons, Votes at 16 was debated and young people of that age group voted for it overwhelmingly as a campaign priority. In April 2015, Labour announced that it would support the policy if it won an overall majority in the 2015 general election, which it failed to do.

There was some criticism about not reducing the voting age to 16 years for the referendum on the membership in the European Union in 2016.

YouGov poll research from 2018 shows that whilst the public are still opposed, there is growing support for extending the franchise. As of May 2019, all the main parties, with the exception of the Conservatives, back reducing the age to 16. Some have argued the Conservatives are hypocritical not to support this, as they allow 16-year-olds to vote in their leadership elections. It is also argued that all the main parties' approach is self-serving as younger voters are thought more likely to support left leaning parties and remaining in the EU, and less likely to support right leaning parties, and leaving the EU.

Scotland 
The Scottish National Party conference voted unanimously on 27 October 2007 for a policy of reducing the voting age to 16 (the age of majority in Scotland), as well as in favour of a campaign for the necessary power to be devolved to the Scottish Parliament.

In September 2011, it was announced that the voting age was likely to be reduced from 18 to 16 for the Scottish independence referendum. This was approved by the Scottish Parliament in June 2013.

In June 2015, the Scottish Parliament voted unanimously to reduce the voting age to 16 for elections for the Scottish Parliament and for Scottish local government elections.

Wales 
Major reforms were recommended in 2017 in the 'A Parliament That Works For Wales' report, by the expert panel on Assembly Electoral Reform led by Professor Laura McAllister. It included increasing the size of the Assembly, adapting or changing the electoral system and of course reducing the age of voting to 16.

The Welsh Assembly's Commission, the corporate body, introduced a bill in 2019 to reduce the voting age to 16 and change the name to Senedd. The National Assembly for Wales passed the Senedd and Election (Wales) Act later that year. A vote to remove this enfranchisement was defeated by 41 votes to 11. The first election to include the biggest enfranchisement in Welsh politics since 1969 was the 2021 Senedd election.

The Welsh Government also legislated for the enfranchisement of 16 and 17-year-olds in the Local Government and Elections (Wales) Act, which received royal assent in 2021. The changes were in place for local Welsh elections in 2022.

Crown dependencies 
Moves to lower the voting age to 16 were successful in each of the three British Crown dependencies from 2006 to 2008. The Isle of Man was the first to amend its law in 2006, when it reduced the voting age to 16 for its general elections, with the House of Keys approving the move by 19 votes to 4.

Jersey followed suit in 2007, when it approved in principle a reduction of the voting age to 16. The States of Jersey voted narrowly in favour, by 25 votes to 21, and the legislative amendments were adopted. The law was sanctioned by Order in Council, and was brought into force in time for the general elections in late 2008.

In 2007, a proposal for a reduction made by the House Committee of the States of Guernsey, and approved by the States' Policy Committee, was adopted by the assembly by 30 votes to 15. An Order in Council sanctioned the law, and it was registered at the Court of Guernsey. It came into force immediately, and the voting age was accordingly reduced in time for the 2008 Guernsey general election.

United States 

In the United States, the debate about lowering voting age from 21 to 18 began during World War II and intensified during the Vietnam War, when most of those subjected to the draft were too young to vote, and the image of young men being forced to risk their lives in the military without the privileges of voting successfully pressured legislators to lower the voting age nationally and in many states. By 1968, several states had lowered the voting age below 21 years: Alaska and Hawaii's minimum age was 20, while Georgia and Kentucky's was 18. In 1970, the Supreme Court in Oregon v. Mitchell ruled that Congress had the right to regulate the minimum voting age in federal elections; however, it decided it could not regulate it at local and state level.

The 26th Amendment (passed and ratified in 1971) prevents states from setting a voting age higher than 18. Except for the express limitations provided for in Amendments XIV, XV, XIX and XXVI, voter qualifications for House and Senate elections are largely delegated to the States under Article I, Section 2 and Amendment XVII of the United States Constitution, which respectively state that "The House of Representatives shall be composed of Members chosen every second Year by the People of the several States, and the Electors in each State shall have the Qualifications requisite for Electors of the most numerous Branch of the State Legislature." and "The Senate of the United States shall be composed of two Senators from each State, elected by the people thereof, for six years; and each Senator shall have one vote. The electors in each State shall have the qualifications requisite for electors of the most numerous branch of the State legislatures."

Seventeen states permit 17-year-olds to vote in primary elections and caucuses if they will be 18 by election day: Colorado, Connecticut, Delaware, Illinois, Indiana, Kentucky, Maine, Maryland, Mississippi, Nebraska, New Mexico, North Carolina, Ohio, South Carolina, Virginia, Vermont, and West Virginia. Iowa, Minnesota, and Nevada allow 17-year-olds to participate in all presidential caucuses, but may not vote in primary elections for other offices. Alaska, Hawaii, Idaho, Kansas, Washington, and Wyoming allow 17-year-olds to participate in only Democratic caucuses, but not in the Republican caucus.

All states allow someone not yet 18 to preregister to vote. Fifteen states — California, Colorado, Delaware, District of Columbia, Florida, Hawaii, Louisiana, Maryland, Massachusetts, New York, North Carolina, Oregon, Rhode Island, Utah, Virginia, and Washington — and Washington, D.C., allow 16-year-olds to preregister. In Maine, Nevada, New Jersey, and West Virginia, 17-year-olds can preregister. Alaska allows a teen to preregister within 90 days of their 18th birthday. Georgia, Iowa, and Missouri allow 17.5-year-olds to preregister if they turn 18 before the next election. Texas allows someone 17 year and 10 months old to preregister. The remaining states, excepting North Dakota, do not specify an age for preregistration so long as the teen will be 18 by the next election (usually the next general election). North Dakota does not require voter registration.

On 3 April 2019, Andrew Yang became the first major presidential candidate to advocate for the United States to lower its voting age to 16. At 16, Americans do not have hourly limits imposed on their work, and they pay taxes. According to Yang, their livelihoods are directly impacted by legislation, and they should therefore be allowed to vote for their representatives.

In 2018, a bill in the Council of the District of Columbia was proposed to lower the voting age to 16, which would make the federal district the first jurisdiction to lower the voting age for federal level elections. In 2019, Washington D.C., Council Member Charles Allen sponsored a debate on whether or not the city should lower the voting age to 16 for all elections, including the presidential election in the city. Allen gained a magnitude of public support although the measure to lower the age of voting stalled.

Youth voting at the local level 
In 2013, the City of Takoma Park, Maryland, became the first place in the United States to lower its voting age to 16 for municipal elections and referendums. , Greenbelt, Hyattsville, Riverdale Park, and Mount Rainier, all in Prince George's County, Maryland, had followed suit.

In 2016, the city of Berkeley, California passed a bill that allowed the voting age to be 16 in school board elections. In May 2020, Oakland City Council President Rebecca Kaplan authored Oakland Measure QQ, which proposed lowering the voting age to 16, for school board elections.  The Oakland City Council voted unanimously to put this measure on the ballot.  On 6 November 2020, the city of Oakland, California voted to pass Oakland Measure QQ, making Oakland the largest United States city to partially enfranchise sixteen year old voters. This ballot measure passed with 67.88% of the vote. However, as of the 2022 elections, Alameda County had not implemented the measure and 16- and 17-year-olds in Berkeley and Oakland remained unable to cast ballots in school board elections.

In Massachusetts, efforts to lower the voting age for local elections to 16 have been made in Ashfield, Brookline, Cambridge, Concord, Harwich, Lowell, Northampton, Shelburne, Somerville, and Wendell, but ultimately failed to gain necessary approval from the state legislature. In November 2022, the Boston City Council approved lowering the local voting age to 16, but the petition must still be approved by the state.

Venezuela 
A request to lower the voting age to 16 was made during consideration of revisions to the Constitution of Venezuela in 2007. Cilia Flores, president of the National Assembly, announced that the Mixed Committee for Constitutional Reform had found the idea acceptable. Following approval in the legislature the amendment formed part of the package of constitutional proposals, and was defeated in the 2007 referendum.

Maximum voting age
There are occasional calls for a maximum voting age, on the grounds that older people have less of a stake in the future of the country or jurisdiction. In fact, however, the only jurisdiction with a maximum voting age is the Vatican City State whose sovereign, (the Pope) is elected by the College of Cardinals. A Cardinal must be below the age of 80 on the date of the previous Pope's death or resignation, in order to vote to elect a new Pope.

List by country

18 is the most common voting age. In some countries and territories 16 or 17 year-olds can vote in at least some elections. Examples of places with full enfranchisement for those aged 16 or 17 include Argentina, Austria, Brazil, Cuba, Ecuador, Nicaragua, East Timor, Greece, and Indonesia.

The only known maximum voting age is in the Holy See, where the franchise for electing a new Pope in the Papal Conclave is restricted to Cardinals under the age of 80.

The following is an alphabetical list of voting ages in the various countries of the world.

Chronology of lowering the voting age to 18
The following is a chronological list of the dates upon which countries lowered the voting age to 18; unless otherwise indicated, the reduction was from 21. In some cases the age was lowered decrementally, and so the "staging points" are also given. Some information is also included on the relevant legal instruments involved.

1863: Argentina (from 21)
1924: Turkey (Previously 25 per the 1876 constitution, reduced to 18 with the 1924 constitution. It was again raised to 22 on 5 December 1934 while granting full women's suffrage, and gradually lowered to 21 in 1961, 20 in 1987 and 18 again in 1995)
1946: Czechoslovakia
1952: Poland
1958: South Africa (white voters only; Electoral Law Amendment Act, 1958)
1969: United Kingdom (Representation of the People Act 1969)
1970
Canada (June 26) for federal elections, via amendment to Canada Elections Act.
West Germany
1971
Netherlands (previous reduction from 23 to 21 in 1965)
United States (1 July), per the Twenty-sixth Amendment. Previously reduced on 1 January 1971 by the Voting Rights Act Amendments 1970, ss. 302, 305 (Prior reductions: Georgia in August 1943, Kentucky in 1955, Guam in 1954 and American Samoa in 1965.)
1972: Finland (from 20; previous reductions were 24 to 21 in 1944 and 21 to 20 in 1968/1969)
1973 
Ireland (5 January) via 4th Amendment of the Constitution. Women under 30 gained the vote in local elections in 1935 and in Dáil elections and referendums in 1922 (Constitution of the Irish Free State). The only popular election (in 1925) to the Free State Seanad had a voting age of 30. 
Philippines (17 January): after the 1973 constitution was announced to have been approved in a plebiscite. Among other things, the new constitution lowered the voting age from 21 to 18.
Australia (New South Wales was the first state to do so, in 1970)
1974 
France (July 5) (Act No. 74-631)
New Zealand: (November) (from 20; previous reduction from 21 to 20 in 1969)
Australia
Dominica
1975 
Sweden (Increased from 21 to 24 in 1911, then lowered to 23 in 1921, 21 in 1945, 20 in 1965, 19 in 1968 and finally to 18 in 1975)
Italy (voting age to elect the Senate remained at 25 until 2021)
1976: Trinidad and Tobago
1978
Denmark (19 September) (from 20; 53.8% in referendum; previous reductions were 25 to 23 in 1953, 23 to 21 in 1961 and 21 to 20 in 1971)
Spain (29 December) (1978 Constitution)
1979: Peru
1981: Belgium
1989: India (28 March) (61st Constitution Amendment Act, 1988 read with Act 21 of 1989)
1991: Switzerland (from 20; referendum held on 3 March)
1992
Austria (from 19; previous reductions were 21 to 20 in 1949 and 20 to 19 in 1970)
Estonia: (29 July) (from 22, according to the 1938 Constitution; was 18 during the Soviet Occupation since 1940 and 16 for the Congress of Estonia in 1990)
 1995: Hong Kong (from 21)
2000: Liechtenstein (from 20; LGBl. 2000 No. 55)
2001: Jordan (July) (from 19; Provisional Election Law No. 34/2001)
2002
Pakistan (21 August) (Legal Framework Order, 2002), was 18 under 1973 Constitution, then increased to 21, then lowered back to 18.
Morocco (11 December) (from 20)
2012: Uzbekistan (July) (from 25)
2015: Saudi Arabia (July) (from 21)
2016: Japan (from 20)
2019 
Malaysia (16 July) (from 21)
South Korea (27 December) (from 19)

Chronology of lowering the voting age to 16
This is a further list, similar to the above but of the dates upon which countries or territories lowered the voting age to 16; unless otherwise indicated, the reduction was from 18.

1980s
Nicaragua: November 1984 (from 21)
Brazil: 1988, first allowed in the 1989 presidential election (Constitution of the Federative Republic of Brazil, 1988)

1990s
Estonia: 24 February 1990 (from 22 according to the 1938 Constitution, from 18 during the Soviet occupation); only for the Congress of Estonia, was raised to 18 according to the 1992 Constitution

2000s
Isle of Man: 11 July 2006; legislation brought into force in time for general election held on 23 November 2006
Austria: 1 July 2007 (BGBl. No. 1/1930, as amended)
Guernsey: 19 December 2007 (Reform (Guernsey) (Amendment) Law, 2007)
Jersey: 1 April 2008 (Public Elections (Amendment No. 2) (Jersey) Law 2008)
Ecuador: 28 September 2008 (New constitution accepted by referendum) for general election on 26 March 2009.

2010s
Argentina: 1 November 2012. Voting for teenagers between 16 and 18 years of age became optional.
Malta: 20 November 2013. Motion passed in parliament to lower the voting age to 16 at local council elections starting from 2015.
Scotland: 18 September 2014. 16- and 17-year-olds were given the vote for the independence referendum. This was subsequently extended permanently for local and Scottish Parliament elections as of the 2016 Parliament election.
Estonia: 6 May 2015, in local elections only.

2020s
Wales: 6 May 2021, for the elections to the Senedd (formerly the National Assembly for Wales). The Welsh Government  has also legislated the enfranchisement of 16 and 17-year-olds in local government elections by May 2022 for the local Welsh elections.
Alderney: 22 September 2022.

Organizations in favour of lowering the voting age

The following are political parties and other campaigning organisations that have either endorsed a lower voting age or who favour its removal.

Alphabetical list of countries

Australia
Australian Democrats
Australian Greens
Australian Labor Party
Socialist Alliance
Democratic Labour Party
Fusion Party
Grapefruit Foundation (to 15 years of age)

Austria
The Greens – The Green Alternative
Liberal Forum
Social Democratic Party of Austria
vote4future.at Austrian National Youth Council

Belgium
Ecolo
Groen
Open Vlaamse Liberalen en Democraten

Canada
Green Party of Canada
Green Party of Quebec
New Democratic Party
Ontario Liberal Party
Parti Québécois

Czechia
Czech Pirate Party
Green Party
Mayors and Independents

Denmark
Social Democrats
Socialist People's Party
Dansk Ungdoms Fællesråd

Estonia
Estonian National Youth Council
Young Social Democrats

France
La France Insoumise

Germany
Foundation for the Rights of Future Generations
K.R.Ä.T.Z.Ä. (demanding abolition of any age-based voting restrictions)
Social Democratic Party of Germany
Alliance 90/The Greens
The Left

Greece
Ecologist Greens

Ireland
Green Party
Labour Party
Sinn Féin
Socialist Party
In 2013, the Constitutional Convention was asked to consider reducing the voting age to 17 and recommended lowering it to 16. The then government agreed to hold a referendum, but in 2015 postponed it indefinitely to give priority to other referendums.

Italy
Five Star Movement
Northern League
Democratic Party

Luxembourg
The Left

Malaysia
UNDI18

Netherlands
GroenLinks
Partij van de Arbeid
Volt Netherlands
Partij voor de Dieren
Democraten 66
BIJ1

New Zealand
Green Party of Aotearoa New Zealand
New Zealand Labour Party
Make It 16 Aotearoa New Zealand

Norway
Liberal Party
Socialist Left Party

Portugal
Left Bloc
LIVRE
People Animals Nature
Socialist Party

Romania
National Liberal Party
National Union for the Progress of Romania

Spain
Izquierda Unida

Sweden

Feminist Initiative
Left Party
Green Party

United Kingdom
Green Party of England and Wales
Green Party Northern Ireland
Labour Party
Liberal Democrats
Liberal Party
National Health Action Party
Plaid Cymru
Scottish Conservatives
Scottish Greens
Scottish National Party
Scottish Socialist Party
Social Democratic and Labour Party
Ulster Unionist Party
Votes at 16

United States
Americans for a Society Free from Age Restrictions (supports full elimination of voting age)
Vote16USA
Future Voters of America
Green Party of Texas
National Youth Rights Association
Rock the Vote
Socialist Party USA (to 15 years of age)
FairVote
Vermont Libertarian Party

See also

Adultcentrism
Age of candidacy
Age of majority
Demeny voting
Democratization
Gerontocracy
Intergenerational equity
Suffrage
Voter registration
Youth
Youth rights
Youth suffrage

Notes

References

Further reading
 Caplan, Sheri J. Old Enough: How 18-Year-Olds Won the Vote & Why it Matters. Heath Hen, 2020. 
 
 
 
  Abridged version (pdf).
 Chan, T.W. & Clayton, M. 2006, "Should the Voting Age be Lowered to Sixteen? Normative and Empirical Considerations", Political Studies, vol. 54, no. 3, pp. 533–558.

External links
Field Listing - Suffrage from the CIA World Factbook
A more complete list of voting ages around the world (in German)
Youth Suffrage Resources
Legal Voting Age by Country by Worldatlas.com

Electoral restrictions
Juvenile law
Law-related lists
Lists by country
Minimum ages
Youth rights